The Cairnhill is a private housing estate in Tsuen Wan, New Territories, Hong Kong. Being one of the estates built on many d level 
of the hill of Route Twisk (Another one is The Cliveden), it consists of 16 low-density blocks divided into 2 phases and completed in 2004 and 2005 respectively, offering a total of 770 units. It was jointly developed by Cheung Kong Holdings, Sino Land and K. Wah International.

Transportation
Resident's bus service route: NR333 (The Cairnhill to Tsuen Wan MTR station)
KMB: Route 51
Minibus: Route 80

See also
The Cliveden

References

External links

Official website of the Cairnhill

Buildings and structures completed in 2004
Buildings and structures completed in 2005
Tsuen Wan
Tsuen Wan District
Private housing estates in Hong Kong
CK Hutchison Holdings
Sino Group